The Puzzle and Snuggles are the nineteenth and the twentieth studio albums by Canadian metal musician Devin Townsend, released on his own label HevyDevy Records on December 3, 2021.

Production
Devin Townsend has explained that The Puzzle is "an elaborate and much more chilled out" version of his 2004 album Devlab and "more a collaborative, multimedia art project that acts as a stopgap between Empath and the next record" that "gave me a chance to purge and be completely creatively free", whereas Snuggles is "meant to be something you listen to in order to feel better... Puzzle is chaos, Snuggles is calm. The whole project is meant to express that I think there is a light at the end of this dark tunnel we’ve been through." The two albums serve as a prelude to a "more traditional album", Lightwork to be produced by Garth Richardson (Rage Against the Machine, Mudvayne, Nickelback) and "an ambitious project he’s been teasing for years called The Moth".

Track listing

Personnel 
Credits adapted from the albums' liner notes.

The Puzzle

 Devin Townsend – bass, guitar, vocals, keyboards and synths
 Morgan Ågren — drums and percussion, vocals
 Fazal – drums and percussion
 Anup Sastry — drums and percussion
 Chris Kelly — drums and percussion, vocals
 Kat Epple — drums and percussion, keyboards and synths, strings, wind instruments, and horns
 Nathan Navarro – bass
 Jonas Hellborg – bass
 Jean Savoie – bass
 Mike Keneally – guitar
 Aman Khosla – guitar, vocals
 Steve Vai – guitar
 Plini – guitar
 Mark Cimino – guitar, vocals, keyboards and synths
 Matt Picone – guitar
 Andy McKee – guitar
 Jed Simon – guitar
 Chrys Johnson – guitar
 Yotam Afik – guitar
 Buckley Kelly – guitar
 Ana Patan – guitar, vocals
 John Bertsche – guitar, vocals
 Tina Ågren – vocals
 Echo Picone – vocals
 Tanya Ghosh – vocals
 Gitai Barak – vocals
 Ché Aimee Dorval – vocals
 Anneke van Giersbergen - vocals
 Samantha Preis – vocals
 Anne Preis – vocals
 Arabella Packford – vocals
 Blindboy Boatclub – vocals
 Shiraz Afik – vocals
 Korina Savoie – vocals
 Chris Johnson – vocals
 Mom Alvarado – vocals
 Pete Mark – vocals
 Amy Wong – vocals
 Mattias Eklundh – keyboards and synths, strings, wind instruments, and horns
 Diego Tejeida – keyboards and synths
 Ben Searles – keyboards and synths
 Mike St-Jean – keyboards and synths
 Phillip Peterson – strings, wind instruments, and horns
 Neyveli Radhakrishna – strings, wind instruments, and horns
 Jørgen Munkeby – strings, wind instruments, and horns

Snuggles

 Devin Townsend – drums and percussion, bass, guitar, vocals, keyboards and synths
 Morgan Ågren – drums and percussion
 Chris Kelly – drums and percussion
 Paul Soroski – drums and percussion
 Jake VanDerGinst – drums and percussion
 Kat Epple – drums and percussion, keyboards and synths, strings, wind instruments, and horns
 Andy McKee – drums and percussion, guitar
 Nathan Navarro – bass
 Jean Savoie – bass
 Andy Timmons – guitar
 Markus Reuter – guitar
 Chrys Johnson – guitar
 Buckley Kelly – guitar
 Ana Patan – guitar, vocals
 Tina Ahlin – vocals
 Aman Khosla – vocals
 Tanya Ghosh – vocals
 Omer Cordell – vocals
 Ché Aimee Dorval – vocals
 Ash Pearson – vocals
 Chika Buston – vocals
 Samantha Preis – vocals
 Anne Preis – vocals
 Arabella Packford – vocals
 Adrian Mottram – vocals
 Katrina Natale – vocals
 Mattias Eklund – keyboards and synths, strings, wind instruments, and horns
 Diego Tejeida – keyboards and synths
 Phillip Peterson – strings, wind instruments, and horns
 Neyveli Radhakrishna – strings, wind instruments, and horns

Technical
 Devin Townsend – production, engineering, editing, mixing
 Leonardo Delgado – additional editing
 Troy Glessner – mastering
 Levi Seitz – lacquer cut
 Travis Smith – artwork, packaging design

Charts

References

Devin Townsend albums
2021 albums
Albums produced by Devin Townsend